Malekiyeh-ye Sofla (also Romanized as Mālekīyeh-ye Soflá; also known as Mālekīyeh, and Mālekīyeh-ye Jonūbī) is a village in Howmeh-ye Sharqi Rural District, in the Central District of Dasht-e Azadegan County, Khuzestan Province, Iran. At the 2006 census, its population was 1,978, in 311 families.

References 

Populated places in Dasht-e Azadegan County